The women's middleweight (−72 kilograms) event at the 2006 Asian Games took place on 9 December 2006 at Qatar SC Indoor Hall, Doha, Qatar.

A total of nine competitors from nine different countries (NOCs) competed in this event, limited to fighters whose body weight was less than 72 kilograms. 

Luo Wei of China, who had won a bronze medal four years ago at the 2002 Asian Games in Busan of South Korea, won the gold medal after beating Alaa Kutkut of Jordan in gold medal match 1–0, The bronze medal was shared by Iranian Mahrouz Saei and Lee In-jong of South Korea.

Athletes from Bahrain, Vietnam, Chinese Taipei and the Philippines lost in the quarterfinal round and shared the fifth place.

Schedule
All times are Arabia Standard Time (UTC+03:00)

Results

References

Results

External links
Official website

Taekwondo at the 2006 Asian Games